George Lawrence Harter Gardner (1 September 1853 – 20 September 1925) was an eminent Anglican priest in the  first quarter of the twentieth century.

Gardner was born on 1 September 1853, educated at Cheltenham College and Corpus Christi College, Cambridge, and ordained in 1875. After a curacy at St. Mary's, Nottingham he was the incumbent at All Saints, Cheltenham  until 1911. From then until 1920 he was Diocesan Chaplain to the Bishop of Birmingham; and Archdeacon of Aston from 1913. His last post was Archdeacon of Cheltenham.

He died on 20 September 1925.

References

1853 births
People educated at Cheltenham College
Alumni of Corpus Christi College, Cambridge
Archdeacons of Aston
Archdeacons of Cheltenham
1925 deaths